Frances Sheridan (née Chamberlaine) (1724 – 26 September 1766) was an Anglo-Irish novelist and playwright.

Life
Frances Chamberlaine was born in Dublin, Ireland. Her father, Dr. Phillip Chamberlaine, was an Anglican minister. In 1747 she married Thomas Sheridan, who was then an actor and theatre director, and at the same time she began work on her first novel, Eugenia and Adelaide. The couple moved to London permanently in 1758 for business reasons (after an earlier sortie to London in 1754). In London Frances was introduced to Samuel Richardson, who encouraged her in her writing. Her most successful novel, Memoirs of Miss Sidney Bidulph (1761), in diary format, was influenced by Samuel Richardson's Pamela. She then turned to drama, and two of her plays were produced at London's Drury Lane theatre by David Garrick's company in the 1760s. Frances Sheridan was the mother of the famous playwright Richard Brinsley Sheridan, and her son's early successful plays were much influenced by his mother's plays. Frances and Thomas Sheridan also had another son, Sackville Sheridan, who only lived two months after his birth in 1754. Frances Sheridan's daughter, Alicia Sheridan Lefanu (1753–1817), wrote a play, Sons of Erin, which was produced in London in 1812. Sheridan's second daughter, Anne Elizabeth Sheridan Lefanu (1756–1837) wrote as well, and some of her journals were published in 1960 as Betsy Sheridan's Journal, Letters from Sheridan's sister, 1784–1786 and 1788–1790. Frances Sheridan died at age 42 in Blois, France. Her oriental tale, The History of Nourjahad, and her sequel to The Memoirs of Miss Sidney Biddulph, were published posthumously.

A book-length biography of Frances Sheridan, Memoirs of the Life and Writings of Mrs. Frances Sheridan, was published in 1824, written by her granddaughter, Alicia LeFanu.

Works

Plays
The Discovery (1763)
The Dupe (1764)
A Trip to Bath (1765)

Novels
Memoirs of Miss Sidney Bidulph (1761)
The History of Nourjahad (1767)
Conclusion of the Memoirs (1767)
Eugenia and Adelaide (unpublished until 1791)

References

External links
 
 
 
Frances Sheridan (Chamberlaine) at James Boswell – a Guide
Frances Sheridan, The History of Nourjahad, The Norton Anthology of English Literature

1724 births
1766 deaths
Writers from Dublin (city)
British women novelists
British women dramatists and playwrights
18th-century British women writers
18th-century British writers
Irish Anglicans